A jet is a stream of fluid that is projected into a surrounding medium, usually from some kind of a nozzle, aperture or orifice. Jets can travel long distances without dissipating.

Jet fluid has higher momentum compared to the surrounding fluid medium. In the case that the surrounding medium is assumed to be made up of the same fluid as the jet, and this fluid has a viscosity, the surrounding fluid is carried along with the jet in a process called entrainment.

Some animals, notably cephalopods, move by jet propulsion, as do rocket engines and jet engines.

Applications 
Liquid jets are used in many different areas. In everyday life, you can find them for instance coming from the water tap, the showerhead, and from spray cans. In agriculture, they play a role in irrigation and in the application of crop protection products. In the field of medicine, you can find liquid jets for example in injection procedures or inhalers. Industry uses liquid jets for waterjet cutting, for coating materials or in cooling towers. Atomized liquid jets are essential for the efficiency of internal combustion engines. But they also play a crucial role in research, for example in the study of proteins, phase transitions, extreme states of matter, laser plasmas, High harmonic generation, and also in particle physics experiments. Also some animals, notably cephalopods, move by jet propulsion. Gas jets are found in rocket engines and jet engines.
Microscopic liquid jets have been studied for their potential application in noninvasive transdermal drug delivery.

See also
 Plane counterflow jets
 Bickley jet
 Landau–Squire jet
 Schlichting jet
 Jet nozzle, how a jet is formed
 Jet damping, a jet carries away angular momentum from a device emitting it
 Jet noise
 Jet of blood
 Astrophysical jet
 Lava fountain
 High pressure jet

References

 Pijush K. Kundu and Ira M. Cohen, "Fluid mechanics, Volume 10", Elsevier, Burlington, MA,USA (2008), 
 

Fluid dynamics